The Shadow Secretary of State for Women and Equalities (previously Shadow Minister for Women, Shadow Minister for Women and Equality, Shadow Minister for Women and Equalities) is a position in the United Kingdom's Official Opposition, and sits in the Shadow Cabinet. The Shadow Secretary of State is responsible for holding the Minister for Women and Equalities, responsible for the Government Equalities Office, to account and is responsible for Opposition policy on women's and equality issues.

The post was upgraded to the Shadow Cabinet rank of Shadow Secretary of State following the snap general election of 2017, with Jeremy Corbyn indicating that if Labour win office at the next election, Women and Equalities will be upgraded to the full status of a government department. Previously, the post was often held together with a Shadow Cabinet post, but sometimes as a Shadow Cabinet post in its own right.

The position, since its creation in 1983, has always been held by a female Member of Parliament. The position has been held by Anneliese Dodds since 21 September 2021, after having been vacant since the resignation of Marsha de Cordova on 14 September 2021.

Shadow ministers

See also
 Official Opposition frontbench

Notes

References

Official Opposition (United Kingdom)
Government Equalities Office